Nafada is a Local Government Area (LGA) of Gombe State, Nigeria. According to the 2006 census, the LGA covers 1,586 square kilometers and has a population of 138,185 people. Nafada has ten wards namely: Nafada East, Nafada Central, Nafada West, Jigawa, Birnin Fulani East, Birnin Bolewa, Birnin Fulani West, Gudukku, Barwo/Nasarawo and Barwo Winde.

History
Nafada is located in the traditional lands of the Bole people. It was the capital of the Gombe Emirate from 1913 to 1919. The Gombe Emirate was moved to Doma which was later renamed to Gombe.

Nafada is one of the eleven Local Government Areas of Gombe State, Nigeria. It has its administrative headquarters at the town of Nafada and it falls under Gombe North senatorial districts therefore constituting a federal constituency with Dukku LGA.

Government 
Since 2020, the local government chairman and deputy chairman are Musa Abubakar and Salisu Shuaibu Dandele respectively.

The postal code of Nafada is 762.

Nafada LGA belongs to Gombe North Senatorial Zone/District along with Dukku, Funakaye, Kwami and Gombe LGA.

Nafada LGA belongs to Nafada/Dukku federal constituency that comprises the entire geographical areas of:                                        

 Nafada Local Government Area
 Dukku Local Government Area

Federal Constituencies in Nigeria are typically made up of a group of local government areas in a particular state and are represented by a member in the Federal House of Representatives.

Geography 
Nafada local government area encompasses a cumulative area of 1,586 square kilometres and it has an average temperature of 33 °C.

The Gongola River flows through the LGA and the area has an average humidity level of 20 percent The Nafada river originated from the River Gongola rises on the Eastern slopes of the Jos-Plateau and falls to the Gongola basin running north-easterly until Nafada and then continued in the same direction to Lake Chad. Presently, it turns south and the south-east until it joins the Hawal River. The river then runs south to the River Benue, joining it opposite the town of Numan. The upper course of the river as well as most of its tributaries are seasonal streams that rapidly fill up in August and September yearly. The lower reaches of the river are impounded by the Dadin Kowa Dam near Gombe and the Kiri Dam further below. Kiri Dam is located at Shelleng LGA of Adamawa state in the north-east of Nigeria which was built to provide irrigation for the Savannah Sugar Company.

Economy of Nafada 
The Nafada LGA is home to several marketplaces, including the Donfa market, where a wide range of goods are bought and sold. In Nafada LGA, there are also a lot of mineral resources, such as limestone and gypsum. Farming, ceramics, handicrafts, the raising and sale of domestic animals, and farming are some other significant economic activity in Nafada LGA. Nafada has heavy deposit of gypsum as one of its biggest mineral resources. The Fika Shale in Nafada area is composed of thick laminated non-gypsiferous red clay, gypsum-rich blue-black shale and mudstone, grey coloured highly fissile shale and sandy clay with occasional cobbles and pebbles. This great resource is however under utilized, a sad reality that makes the local Government one amongst those with least infrastructure.

References 

Local Government Areas in Gombe State